"Chaiyya Chaiyya" ("[walk] in shade") is an Indian pop-folk song, featured in the soundtrack of the Bollywood film Dil Se.., released in 1998. Based on Sufi music and Urdu poetry, the single was composed by A.R. Rahman, written by Gulzar, and sung by Sukhwinder Singh and Sapna Awasthi. The accompanying music video was directed by Mani Ratnam and picturised on Shah Rukh Khan and Malaika Arora, where they perform the song on top of a moving train.

"Chaiyya Chaiyya" was a critical and commercial success, selling over six million units in India and earning a cult following internationally, and is often cited as an influential track in Hindi cinema. In 2002, the BBC World Service conducted an international poll to choose the ten most popular songs of all time: "Chaiyya Chaiyya" finished ninth.

History
The lyrics of "Chaiyya Chaiyya" are based on the Sufi folk song "Thaiyya Thaiyya" with lyrics by poet Bulleh Shah. Singer Sukhwinder Singh originally suggested the song to A.R. Rahman who was looking for a Punjabi devotional song to include on the soundtrack of Dil Se... Gulzar subsequently rewrote the lyrics and changed the name to "Chaiyya Chaiyya".

"Chaiyya Chaiyya" reached the top of the charts in India and became popular in the United Kingdom.

In an Interview with called "Sadhanai Tamilargal" with Mani Ratnam, AR Rahman and Vairamuthu, Rahman stated that the song was originally composed for his album Vande Mataram. But as it didn't fit in, he decided to show it to Mani Ratnam, who loves these kind of catchy tunes. The very first time hearing the song, Mani Ratnam decided to shoot the song on a train.

Music video
The video was filmed on top of the Ooty train, powered by X-Class Steam Locomotive (the Nilgiri Mountain Railway) in mountainous Tamil Nadu, southern India, while actor Shahrukh Khan dances with model/actress Malaika Arora and other dancers. The film was directed by Mani Ratnam and recorded by Santosh Sivan. The choreography was completed in four and half days by Farah Khan. No major back projections or post-production special effects were used in the music video.

Malaika Arora, one of the performers, recalls: "Would you believe it? Well, the "Chaiya Chaiya" song was shot exactly as you see it on the screen: No camera tricks, no back projection, no post-production special effects!" She also said that "...One of the unit members tripped and hurt himself. Other than that, things were safe."

Popular culture

The song was featured in the opening of the second act of the musical Bombay Dreams, in which the train sequence from Dil Se.. is recreated on stage.

Harris Jayaraj's "Orugalluke Pilla" song from "Sainikudu" movie was based on this song

Remixes of the song were used in the opening and closing credits of the 2006 film Inside Man. The opening credits, set over shots of the robbery crew driving into Manhattan, feature an abridged version of the original with additional trumpet accompaniment, and the closing credits feature a hip-hop-inflected remix featuring Panjabi MC ("Chaiyya Chaiyya Bollywood Joint").

The song was featured in the background in episode 13 of the American sitcom Outsourced.

The song was featured in the pilot episode of Smith. A cover of this song was performed in episode 5 of season 5 of CSI: Miami.

The original track and a live version of "Chaiyya Chaiyya" are featured in AR Rahman's compilation album, A. R. Rahman – A World of Music.

The song was used during the opening ceremony of the 2010 Commonwealth Games held at the Jawaharlal Nehru Stadium, New Delhi on 3 October 2010.

"Chaiyya Chaiyya" became famous in Indonesia in 2011, after Norman Kamaru, a policeman from Gorontalo, Indonesia recorded himself lipsync-ing it and uploaded the video to YouTube. The name of the video is "Polisi Gorontalo Menggila" (Crazy Gorontalo Police).

On 17 May 2015, recording artist Kurt Hugo Schneider with Sam Tsui, Vidya and Shankar Tucker, uploaded a mashup video on YouTube titled Chaiyya Chaiyya / Don't Stop MASHUP!! - INDIA EDITION ft Sam Tsui, Shankar Tucker, Vidya. It garnered 300,000 views in 3 days. Shah Rukh Khan tweeted it, appreciating their work. As of July 2022, the YouTube video has nearly 7 million views.

The a cappella group Penn Masala covered the song in their seventh album, Panoramic.

Eammon, one of the characters of Kamila Shamsie's novel Home Fire looks up the video and lyrics of the song in his attempt to learn Urdu.

The Telugu version of this song was sung by Mano and Sahithi at ETV@20 Tenali, held at Tenali in February 2016

GrooveDev in the same year (2016) created the Remix of this song

The song was used in a 2021 holiday commercial for Ikea in Canada

Awards and nominations

References

External links

1998 songs
Hindi film songs
Indian songs
Sufi music
Songs with music by A. R. Rahman
Songs with lyrics by Gulzar
Sukhwinder Singh songs
Urdu-language songs
Tamil film songs
Sufi songs